Lealman, known as East Lealman until 2010, is a census-designated place (CDP) in Pinellas County, Florida, United States. The population was 19,879 at the 2010 census. Prior to 2010, Lealman was part of a larger CDP named West and East Lealman.

Community Redevelopment Area
In 2015, the Pinellas County Board of County Commissioners created the Lealman Community Redevelopment Area (CRA), the first redevelopment area in unincorporated Pinellas County.

Geography
Lealman is located at  (27.8197, -82.6846). The community is bordered by the city of Pinellas Park to the north, St. Petersburg to the east and south, and by the town of West Lealman to the west.

Demographics

References

External links
Lealman Fire District
Lealman profile from Hometownlocator

Census-designated places in Pinellas County, Florida
Census-designated places in Florida